Microseris campestris is a species of flowering plant in the family Asteraceae known by the common name San Joaquin silverpuffs. It is endemic to California, where it grows in the San Joaquin Valley and adjacent Sierra Nevada foothills, and the central California Coast Ranges. It is a resident of grassland and open slope habitats, sometimes near vernal pools.

Description
Microseris campestris is an annual herb growing up to half a meter-1.5 feet tall from a basal rosette of erect leaves; there is no true stem. Each leaf is up to 20 centimeters long and has edges divided into many lobes.

The inflorescence is borne on a peduncle arising from ground level. The flower head contains up to 100 white or yellow ray florets. The fruit is an achene with a gray or brown, sometimes speckled body a few millimeters long. At the tip of the body is a large pappus made up of five long, bristly scales.

External links
Calflora Database: Microseris campestris (San Joaquin microseris,  San Joaquin silverpuffs)
Jepson Manual eFlora (TJM2) treatment of Microseris campestris
USDA Plants Profile for Microseris campestris (San Joaquin silverpuffs)
Flora of North America
UC Photos gallery — Microseris campestris

campestris
Endemic flora of California
Flora of the Sierra Nevada (United States)
Natural history of the California chaparral and woodlands
Natural history of the Central Valley (California)
Natural history of the California Coast Ranges
~
Taxa named by Edward Lee Greene
Flora without expected TNC conservation status